is a Japanese playwright, novelist, contributing editor and screenwriter. In addition to working on Getter Robo, he is a fan of Ken Ishikawa. He took pride in being a "Getter Person". This was the same Futabasha's chief producer and production representative worked on each productions.

Screenwriting credits

Manga 

Getter Robo Saga (Editor) 
Kyomu Senki (Editor)

Anime
Series head writer denoted in bold 
Gurren Lagann (2007)
Oh! Edo Rocket (2007)
Nodame Cantabile: Finale (2010)
Kill la Kill (2013-2014)
Concrete Revolutio: The Last Song (2016)
BNA: Brand New Animal (2020)
Back Arrow (2021)

OVA
 Re: Cutie Honey (2004)

Anime films
 Gurren Lagann: Childhood’s End (2008)
 Gurren Lagann: The Lights in the Sky are Stars (2009)
 Crayon Shin-chan: Intense Battle! Robo Dad Strikes Back (2014)
 Batman Ninja (2018)
 Promare (2019)

Live action television
Series head writer denoted in bold
 Ultraman Max (2006)
 Juken Sentai Gekiranger (2007)
 Kamen Rider W (2010)
 Kamen Rider Fourze (2011-2012)
 Futagashira (2015-2016)

Live action films
 Seven Souls in the Skull Castle (2004)
 Ashura (2005)
 Hidden Fortress: The Last Princess (2008)
 Kamen Rider × Kamen Rider Fourze & OOO: Movie War Mega Max (2011)
 Beginning: Fight! Legendary Seven Riders
 Fuuto, the Conspiracy Advances: Gallant! Kamen Rider Joker
 Kamen Rider Fourze: Nadeshi-Ko Ad-Vent
 Movie War Mega Max: Gather! Warriors of Glory
 Kamen Rider Fourze the Movie: Space, Here We Come! (2012)
 Kamen Rider × Kamen Rider Wizard & Fourze: Movie War Ultimatum (2012)
 Kamen Rider Fourze
 Terra Formars (2016)

References

External links 
 
 Kazuki Nakashima anime works at Media Arts Database 

Living people
Rikkyo University alumni
1959 births